Nuckolls County is a county located in the U.S. state of Nebraska. As of the 2020 United States Census, the population was 4,095. Its county seat is Nelson.

In the Nebraska license plate system, Nuckolls County is represented by the prefix 42 (it had the 42nd-largest number of vehicles registered in the county when the license plate system was established in 1922).

History

19th century
Nuckolls County was formed in 1860, and was organized in 1871. It was named after brothers Lafayette Nuckolls, a member of the first Nebraska territorial legislature, and Stephen Friel Nuckolls, a pioneering Nebraska settler, businessman and banker. Nuckolls was also a notorious slaveowner who was followed by national news in 1860 when he tracked down an enslaved person he owned, named Eliza Grayson. She had escaped from him via the Underground Railroad two years earlier. With the help of a professional kidnapper they attempted to remove the woman from Chicago, where she was found, only to be arrested by local law enforcement. Nuckolls and the enslaved woman were put in the Chicago jail, only for an abolitionist mob to free her and shuttle her away to Canada. Nuckolls went on to prominence and admiration in Nebraska after sympathizing with the Confederate states during the civil war.

In 1887, Atchison, Topeka and Santa Fe Railway built a branch line from Neva, Kansas (3 miles west of Strong City) to Superior, Nebraska. At some point, the rails were removed from Neva, KS to Lost Springs, KS, but the right-of-way has not been abandoned. As of 2020, the BNSF Line from Superior, NE to Lost Springs, KS was active and carrying rail traffic to and from Superior. This branch line was originally called "Strong City and Superior line" but later the name was shortened to the "Strong City line". In 1996, the Atchison, Topeka and Santa Fe Railway merged with Burlington Northern Railroad, renamed to the current BNSF Railway. Most locals still refer to this railroad as the "Santa Fe".

Geography
Nuckolls County lies on the south line of Nebraska. Its south boundary line abuts the north boundary line of the state of Kansas. The Republican River flows southeastward through the SW corner of the county The upper county area is drained by two creeks, Elk Creek and Oxbow Creek, that flow northeastward to discharge into Crooked Creek, which then flows eastward into adjacent Thayer County. The Nuckolls County terrain consists of vegetation-covered rolling hills, sloped to the east. A portion of the area is dedicated to agriculture, especially in the northeast corner.

Major Highways

  U.S. Highway 136
  Nebraska Highway 4
  Nebraska Highway 8
  Nebraska Highway 14

Adjacent counties

 Clay County - north
 Fillmore County - northeast
 Thayer County - east
 Republic County, Kansas - southeast
 Jewell County, Kansas - southwest
 Webster County - west

Protected areas
 Smartweed Marsh State Wildlife Management Area

Demographics

As of the 2000 United States Census, there were 5,057 people, 2,218 households, and 1,443 families in the county. The population density was 9 people per square mile (3/km2). There were 2,530 housing units at an average density of 4 per square mile (2/km2). The racial makeup of the county was 98.91% White, 0.02% Black or African American, 0.06% Native American, 0.16% Asian, 0.53% from other races, and 0.32% from two or more races. 1.01% of the population were Hispanic or Latino of any race.

There were 2,218 households, out of which 26.50% had children under the age of 18 living with them, 58.80% were married couples living together, 4.60% had a female householder with no husband present, and 34.90% were non-families. 32.30% of all households were made up of individuals, and 18.00% had someone living alone who was 65 years of age or older. The average household size was 2.26 and the average family size was 2.86.

The county population contained 23.40% under the age of 18, 5.40% from 18 to 24, 22.50% from 25 to 44, 24.30% from 45 to 64, and 24.40% who were 65 years of age or older. The median age was 44 years. For every 100 females there were 92.50 males.  For every 100 females age 18 and over, there were 91.90 males.

The median income for a household in the county was $28,958, and the median income for a family was $35,018. Males had a median income of $24,533 versus $17,806 for females. The per capita income for the county was $15,608. About 6.50% of families and 11.20% of the population were below the poverty line, including 16.70% of those under age 18 and 8.90% of those age 65 or over.

Communities

Cities
 Nelson (county seat)
 Superior

Villages

 Hardy
 Lawrence
 Nora
 Oak
 Ruskin

Unincorporated communities
 Angus
 Bostwick
 Cadams

Politics
Nuckolls County voters are reliably Republican. In only one national election since 1936 has the county selected the Democratic Party candidate.

See also
 National Register of Historic Places listings in Nuckolls County NE

References

External links

 
 Andreas' History of the State of Nebraska - Nuckolls County

 
1871 establishments in Nebraska
Populated places established in 1871